Louis II d'Orléans, duc de Longueville and comte de Dunois (1510 – 9 June 1537) was a French aristocrat and the first husband of Mary of Guise, who later became queen consort of Scotland and mother to Mary, Queen of Scots. He was the second son of Louis I d'Orléans, duc de Longueville by his wife Jeanne of Hochberg, and succeeded his brother Claude when the latter died in 1524.

He married Mary of Guise on 4 August 1534 at the Louvre Palace. During their brief marriage, the couple had two children: 
François, born 30 October 1535, who would later succeed to the dukedom
Louis, a posthumous child born 4 August 1537, who died four months later.

Louis died at Rouen on 9 June 1537, Mary would later marry James V of Scotland.

Ancestry

Notes

References

Sources

1510 births
1537 deaths
Louis II d'Orleans
House of Valois-Orléans
16th-century peers of France